This is a summary of 1910 in music in the United Kingdom.

Events
22 February – Frederick Delius's latest opera, A Village Romeo and Juliet is premièred at the Royal Opera House, Covent Garden, with Thomas Beecham conducting.
10 November – Fritz Kreisler is the soloist and Edward Elgar the conductor at the première of his Violin Concerto in B Minor, in London.

Popular music
"I'm Henery the Eighth, I Am"; by Fred Murray and R. P. Weston, performed by Harry Champion
"Macushla"; music by Dermot MacMurrough and lyrics by Josephine V. Rowe
"When Father Papered the Parlour"; by R. P. Weston and Fred J. Barnes, performed by Billy Williams

Classical music: new works
Rutland Boughton – Five Celtic Songs
George Dyson - Choral Symphony
Katharine Emily Eggar - Idyll for flute and piano
Ralph Vaughan Williams
Fantasia on a Theme of Thomas Tallis
Symphony No. 1 ("A Sea Symphony")
Classical music was brought ton of exposure, with songs made by Rutland Boughton, George Dyson, and many other talented classical composures.

Opera
Two Merry Monarchs, book by Arthur Anderson and George Levy, lyrics by Anderson and Hartley Carrick, and music by Orlando Morgan

Musical theatre
19 February – The Balkan Princess, by Frederick Lonsdale and Frank Curzon, with lyrics by Paul Rubens and Arthur Wimperis, and music by Paul Rubens, opens at the Prince of Wales Theatre, starring Isabel Jay and Bertram Wallis; it runs for 176 performances.

Births
10 February – Joyce Grenfell, actress, comedian and singer-songwriter (died 1979)
15 February – Stanley Vann, composer, conductor and choirmaster (died 2010)
10 June – Robert Still, composer of tonal music (died 1971)
15 June – Alf Pearson, singer and variety performer with his brother as half of Bob and Alf Pearson (died 2012)
17 June – Sam Costa, crooner, radio actor and disc jockey (died 1981)
22 June – Peter Pears, tenor (died 1986)
15 July – Ronald Binge, composer of light music (died 1973)
16 October – William Reed, composer (died 2002)
1 December – Alicia Markova, ballerina (died 2004)
date unknown – Val Rosing, dance band singer, later an opera singer under the name Gilbert Russell (died 1969)

Deaths
3 May – Lottie Collins, singer and dancer, 44 (heart disease)
10 May – Anna Laetitia Waring, poet and hymn-writer, 87

See also
 1910 in the United Kingdom

References

British Music, 1910 in
Music
British music by year
1910s in British music